Sukiya may refer to:

 Sukiya-zukuri, traditional Japanese interior
 a synonym for chashitsu, a Japanese tea room
 Sukiya (restaurant chain)